Lebbeus Egerton (May 4, 1773 – August 18, 1846) was a Vermont militia officer and farmer who served as the tenth lieutenant governor of Vermont from 1831 to 1835.

Biography
Lebbeus Egerton was born in Norwich, Connecticut on May 4, 1773. His family moved to Randolph, Vermont in the early 1780s and Egerton became a farmer.

During the War of 1812 Egerton served as a captain. Initially commissioned in the 31st United States Infantry Regiment, Egerton subsequently raised and commanded a company in the Vermont militia during the Plattsburgh campaign, with Martin Flint as his second in command.  Egerton later served as adjutant of a regiment.

Egerton served in the Vermont House of Representatives from 1825 to 1827, and was a delegate to the 1828 Vermont constitutional convention.  He was Randolph's Town Clerk from 1830 to 1833. During his life Egerton also served in other local offices, including town Selectman.

Active as an Anti-Mason, in 1831 Egerton was elected Lieutenant Governor and he served until 1835.  Because the annual elections were three way races, Egerton did not receive the majority required by the Vermont constitution, so he was chosen each year by the Vermont Legislature.

During the early to mid-1830s Egerton was responsible for designing and overseeing construction of the second Vermont State House.

From 1837 to 1838 and 1839 to 1840, Egerton served in the Vermont Senate.

Egerton died in Randolph on August 18, 1846 and was buried in Randolph Center Cemetery.

His Randolph Center home still stands and is a privately owned residence.

Other
His first name is sometimes written "Lebberis", "Libbeus" or "Lebbons", and his surname sometimes appears in records as "Edgerton".

References 

1773 births
1846 deaths
Lieutenant Governors of Vermont
Vermont state senators
Members of the Vermont House of Representatives
People from Randolph, Vermont
American militiamen in the War of 1812
Anti-Masonic Party politicians from Vermont
United States Army personnel of the War of 1812